Sir Ewen Paul Cameron (15 January 1891 – 18 January 1964) was an Australian politician.

Background
Cameron was born in Preston, Victoria, the son of Martin Cameron, a grazier from Scotland, and his wife Jane. From 1915 to 1918, he served in the 4th Light Horse Regiment of the Australian Army.

He was a founding member of the Camberwell branch of the United Australia Party, and was a campaign manager for Trevor Oldham and Robert Menzies. On 7 August 1948, Cameron was elected to the Victorian Legislative Council in a by-election as one of two Liberal Party members for East Yarra Province.

Minister of Health
When Henry Bolte defeated John Cain at the 1955 election, Cameron was appointed to the Bolte Ministry as minister of health, in which capacity he served for over six years. When the ministry was reconstituted in 1961, Cameron (who had been knighted that year for his service as health minister), became chair of committees in the Legislative Council. He died in office in 1964.

References

1891 births
1964 deaths
Members of the Victorian Legislative Council
Australian Knights Bachelor
Australian politicians awarded knighthoods
Australian people of Scottish descent
Australian pastoralists
Liberal Party of Australia members of the Parliament of Victoria
Politicians from Melbourne
Australian Army soldiers
Australian military personnel of World War I
20th-century Australian politicians
People from Preston, Victoria